In enzymology, a lactaldehyde reductase (NADPH) is an enzyme that catalyzes the chemical reaction

propane-1,2-diol + NADP+  L-lactaldehyde + NADPH + H+

Thus, the two substrates of this enzyme are 1,2-propanediol and NADP+, whereas its 3 products are L-lactaldehyde, NADPH, and H+.

This enzyme belongs to the family of oxidoreductases, specifically those acting on the CH-OH group of donor with NAD+ or NADP+ as acceptor. The systematic name of this enzyme class is propane-1,2-diol:NADP+ oxidoreductase. Other names in common use include lactaldehyde (reduced nicotinamide adenine dinucleotide phosphate), reductase, NADP+-1,2-propanediol dehydrogenase, propanediol dehydrogenase, 1,2-propanediol:NADP+ oxidoreductase, and lactaldehyde reductase (NADPH).

References

 

EC 1.1.1
NADPH-dependent enzymes
Enzymes of unknown structure